Admiral Sir Hyde Parker (1739 – 16 March 1807) was an admiral of the British Royal Navy.

Biography
He was born in Devonshire, England, the second son of Admiral Sir Hyde Parker, 5th Baronet (1714–1782). He entered the Royal Navy at an early age, and became lieutenant on 25 January 1758, having passed most of his early service in his father's ships.

His services on this occasion earned him a knighthood in 1779. In 1778 he was engaged in the Savannah expedition, and in the following year his ship was wrecked on the hostile Cuban coast. His men, however, entrenched themselves, and were in the end brought off safely. He became commander-in-chief of the Leeward Islands Station in 1779.

Parker was with his father at the Battle of Dogger Bank, and with Richard Howe in the two actions in the Straits of Gibraltar. He reached flag rank on 1 February 1793, the same day that war was declared against the new French Republic. As rear admiral, he served under Samuel Hood at Toulon and in Corsica. He was promoted to vice admiral on 4 July 1794 and took part, under The Lord Hotham, in the indecisive fleet actions on 13 March 1795 and 13 July 1795. From 1796 to 1800 he was in command at the Jamaica Station and ably conducted the operations in the West Indies. These included the tracking down and execution of a number of crewmen involved in the mutiny on board HMS Hermione in 1797.

In 1801 he was appointed to command the Baltic Fleet destined to break up the northern armed neutrality, with Vice-Admiral Horatio Nelson as his second-in-command. Copenhagen, the first objective of the expedition, fell in the Battle of Copenhagen on 2 April 1801 to the fierce attack of Nelson's squadron – Parker, with the heavier ships, taking little part due to the shallowness of the channel. At the height of the battle Parker, who was loath to infringe the customary rules of naval warfare, raised the flag to disengage. Famously, Nelson ignored the order from his commander by raising his telescope to his blind eye and exclaiming "I really do not see the signal" (although this is generally accepted to be a myth). Nelson pressed on with the action and ultimately compelled the Danish forces to capitulate. Parker's hesitation to advance up the Baltic Sea after his victory was later severely criticised. Soon afterwards he was recalled and Nelson succeeded him. He died on 16 March 1807.

Character assessment
In Parker's entry in the Oxford Dictionary of National Biography his biographer Clive Wilkinson writes that until the Copenhagen affair he had "a good professional reputation" but after Copenhagen he was "considered irresolute and dilatory. In Wilson's opinion  "As an officer, Parker was an able administrator rather than a great leader and this was to prove a weakness when it came to having both St Vincent as his chief and Nelson as a subordinate"; and that "He was evidently a popular man for as Nelson wrote after Copenhagen:"

Family
Parker was twice married: first, to Anne, daughter of John Palmer Boteler, and by her had three sons; second, in 1800, he married Frances, a daughter of Admiral Sir Richard Onslow, and made their home at the manor house in Benhall on the Suffolk coast.

His first son – the third Hyde Parker (1786–1854) – became a rear admiral in turn on 23 November 1841 and vice admiral on 4 June 1852. From 1853 he served as First Sea Lord of the Royal Navy, and died on 25 May 1854. His son Hyde, a captain in the navy, commanded Firebrand in the Black Sea, and was killed on 8 July 1854 when storming a Russian fort at the mouth of the Danube.

Two other notable family members who fought in the Napoleonic wars are Parker's second son, John Boteler Parker, who died a major general and C.B. in 1851, and the youngest, Harry, a lieutenant in the guards, who fell at the Battle of Talavera.

Notes

References

 
Attribution
 

|-

1739 births
1807 deaths
Royal Navy admirals
Royal Navy personnel of the American Revolutionary War
Royal Navy personnel of the French Revolutionary Wars
British naval commanders of the Napoleonic Wars
Onslow family
Sea captains
Younger sons of baronets
Knights Bachelor
British military personnel of the Fourth Anglo-Dutch War
Military personnel from Devon